Dicrocheles is a genus of mites in the family Laelapidae.

Species
 Dicrocheles hippeoides Treat, 1978
 Dicrocheles phalaenodectes (Treat, 1954)

References

Laelapidae